Pucasalla (possibly from Quechua puka red, salla large cliff of gravel, "red cliff of gravel") is a mountain in the Vilcanota mountain range in the Andes of Peru, about  high. It is located in the Cusco Region, Canchis Province, Pitumarca District, east of Sibinacocha. It lies south of the peak of Condoriquiña.

References

Mountains of Cusco Region
Mountains of Peru